The mission of Florida Sea Grant, which is headquartered at the University of Florida in Gainesville, Florida, is to help create a sustainable coastal economy and environment through research, education, and extension. The Florida Sea Grant has extension agents in sixteen Florida colleges and in all of Florida's coastal counties except seven. The Boating and Waterway Management Program is one of its program areas.

References

External links
 Florida Sea Grant website

Education in Florida
Environment of Florida